The Idaho Senate is the upper chamber of the Idaho State Legislature. It consists of 35 Senators elected to two-year terms, each representing a district of the state. The Senate meets at the Idaho State Capitol in Boise, Idaho.

Composition of the Senate
Since 1960, the Idaho Senate has been controlled by the Republican Party.

Leadership of the 68th Legislature

Committee Chairs of the 66th Legislature

Members of the Idaho Senate

Past composition of the Senate

See also
 Idaho House of Representatives

References

External links
Idaho State Legislature official government website
State Senate of Idaho at Project Vote Smart

State upper houses in the United States
Idaho Legislature